The 10th Vermont Infantry Regiment was an infantry regiment in the Union Army during the American Civil War.

Service
The 10th Vermont Infantry was organized at Brattleboro, Vermont, and mustered in for three years service on September 1, 1862, under the command of Colonel Albert Burton Jewett.

The regiment was attached to Grover's Brigade, Military District of Washington, until February 1863, Jewett's Brigade, Provisional Division, XXII Corps, Dept. of Washington, until June 1863, French's Command, VIII Corps, Middle Department, until July 1863, 1st Brigade, 3rd Division, III Corps, Army of the Potomac, until March 1864, and 1st Brigade, 3rd Division, VI Corps, Army of the Potomac and Army of the Shenandoah, Middle Military Division, until June 1865.

The 10th Vermont Infantry was mustered out of service at Washington, D.C. on June 22, 1865. Afterwards, recruits were transferred to the 5th Vermont Infantry.

Detailed service record
The timeline of the 10th Vermont Infantry service included:
1862
Moved to Washington, D.C., September 6–8.
Camp at Arlington Heights until September 14, 1862.
March to Seneca Locks, Md., September 14–17.
Guard duty along the Potomac from Edward's Ferry to Muddy Branch until October 11 and at Seneca Creek until November 13.
At Offutt's Cross Roads until December 21.
Moved to Poolesville December 21
1863
Duty at White's Ford (Companies C, E, H, and I); at mouth of the Monocacy (Companies A, F, and D); at Conrad's Ferry (Companies B, G, and K) until April 19, 1863.
At Poolesville, Md., to June 24.
Moved to Harper's Ferry, W. Va., June 24–26, thence to Frederick, Md., June 30, and to Monocacy July 2.
Pursuit of Lee July 6–23.
Wapping Heights July 23.
At Routt's Hill August 1-September 15.
At Culpeper until October 8.
Bristoe Campaign October 9–22.
Auburn and Bristoe October 14.
Advance to the Rappahannock November 7–8.
Kelly's Ford November 7.
Brandy Station November 8.
Mine Run Campaign November 26-December 2.
Payne's Farm November 27.

1864
Demonstration on the Rapidan February 6–7, 1864.
Campaign from the Rapidan to the James May–June.
Battles of the Wilderness May 5–7
Spottsylvania May 8–12
Spottsylvania Court House May 12–21
Assault on the Salient, Spottsylvania Court House, May 12
North Anna River May 23–26
Pamunkey River May 26–28
Totopotomoy May 28–31
Cold Harbor June 1–12
Before Petersburg June 18–19
Jerusalem Plank Road June 22–23
Siege of Petersburg until July 6
Moved to Baltimore, Md., July 6–8
Battle of Monocacy July 9
Expedition to Snicker's Gap July 14–24
Sheridan's Shenandoah Valley Campaign August 6-November 28.
Gilbert's Ford, Opequan, September 13.
Battle of Opequan, Winchester, September 19.
Fisher's Hill September 22.
Battle of Cedar Creek October 19.
Camp Russell November 10.
Duty at Kernstown until December. Moved to Washington, D.C., thence to Petersburg, Va., December 3–6.
Siege of Petersburg December 13, 1864, to April 2, 1865.
1865
Fort Fisher, before Petersburg, March 25, 1865.
Appomattox Campaign March 28-April 9.
Assault on and capture of Petersburg April 2.
Sayler's Creek April 6.
Appomattox Court House April 9.
Surrender of Lee and his army. March to Danville April 23–27 and duty there until May 16.
Moved to Richmond, thence march to Washington May 24-June 3.
Corps Review June 8.

Casualties
The regiment lost a total of 352 men during service; 9 officers and 140 enlisted men were killed or mortally wounded and 203 enlisted men died of disease.

Commanders
 Lieutenant Colonel William Y. W. Ripley (declined because of wounds)
 Colonel Albert Burton Jewett - resigned April 25, 1864
 Colonel William Wirt Henry - Medal of Honor recipient for action at the Battle of Cedar Creek

Notable members
 Lieutenant George Evans Davis, Company D - Medal of Honor recipient for action at the Battle of Monocacy
 Corporal Alexander Scott, Company D - Medal of Honor recipient for action at the Battle of Monocacy
 Captain Hiram R. Steele, Company K - Attorney General of Louisiana and Brooklyn District Attorney
 Sergeant Charles A. Woodruff, Company A - later USMA alumni and Brigadier General, U.S. Army

See also
 List of Vermont Civil War units
 Vermont in the American Civil War

References

External links
 Monument of the 10th Vermont Infantry at Monocacy
 10th Vermont Infantry Descendants Association
 Vermont National Guard Library and Museum

Attribution
 

Military units and formations established in 1862
Military units and formations disestablished in 1865
Units and formations of the Union Army from Vermont
1862 establishments in Vermont